Artipic is a graphics editor developed for Microsoft Windows and macOS.

Artipic features drawing, editing, retouching, transforming and composing images including color corrections, effects and layer-based operations. It converts all common image formats and imports camera raw formats.

In the global image editing ecosystem Artipic can be positioned somewhere in the middle. It differs from simple free photo editors by more advanced capabilities, however it does not cover the complete professional-level functionality pack provided by industry leaders like Adobe Photoshop.

History
Artipic developed by Swedish company Artipic AB. Artipic 1.0 was released in March 2014 as a free version. The first commercial version on Microsoft Windows was released in November 2014, on macOS – in October 2015.

Features
 Supports Microsoft Windows and macOS
 Standard tools: select, crop, move, rotate, transform, stamp, color picking, text
 Advanced tools: custom brushes, gradients, shapes, paths, layers and masks
 Special tools: healing brush, red-eye effect reduction, dodge and burn brushes 
 Adjustments: Brightness & Contrast, Hue & Saturation, Curves, Levels, Color Balance, Gamma Correction, Exposure, Color Temperature, Tint, Color Enhancer, Photo Filter Simulation, Posterization, Thresholding
 Filters: Smoothen, Sharpen, Vignetting, High-pass, Diffuse Glow, Shadow, Gaussian Blur
 Reversible (non-destructive) stylization presets
 Batch processing
 White balance
 RAW-converter including Gray Card
 Adobe Photoshop images supported

Version history

See also
Image editing
Comparison of raster graphics editors

References

External links



Photo software
Graphics software
Raster graphics editors